Zebak is one of the 29 districts of Badakhshan province in northeastern Afghanistan. It is home to an estimated 8,749 residents, most living in Zebak, the district's capital. Sanglechi-Ishkashmi language, also referred to as Zebaki, is spoken in the district.

References

External links
Map at the Afghanistan Information Management Services

Districts of Badakhshan Province